This is the statistics of 2020 Myanmar National League.

Season statistics

Top scorers
As of 1 October 2020.

Most assists
As of 1 October 2020.

Clean sheets
As of 1 Oct 2020.

See also
2020 Myanmar National League

References 

Myanmar sport-related lists
Myanmar National League